Count  was a Japanese statesman in the Taishō period.

Ōki was born in Tokyo. His father, Ōki Takatō was one of the leaders in the Meiji Restoration, and served in numerous cabinet posts in the early Meiji government. In 1899, Enkichi succeeded to his father’s title of count (hakushaku) under the kazoku peerage system. His political career began in 1908, when he was elected to the House of Peers. He initially supported the Kenkyūkai, but soon switched his allegiance to the Rikken Seiyūkai. He was appointed Justice Minister under the cabinet of Prime Minister Hara, a post which he also held under the succeeding Takahashi administration. In 1923, he cooperated with Home Minister Tokonami Takejirō to introduce tightened anti-subversive legislature in response to increasing leftist agitation in the labor disputes, and the public emergence of the Japan Communist Party. Ōki was subsequently Railroad Minister under the Katō and Kiyoura administrations.

References 
 Minichiello. Sharon. Japan's Competing Modernities: Issues in Culture and Democracy, 1900-1930. University of Hawaii Press, 1998

Notes 

1871 births
1926 deaths
Politicians from Tokyo
Government ministers of Japan
Ministers of Justice of Japan
Members of the House of Peers (Japan)
Kazoku
Rikken Seiyūkai politicians
20th-century Japanese politicians